Mieum (sign: ㅁ; Korean: 미음) is a consonant of the Korean alphabet. The Unicode for ㅁ is U+3141. It indicates an 'm' sound. The IPA pronunciation is [m].

Stroke order

Other communicative representations

References 

Hangul jamo